Harri Heliövaara and Emil Ruusuvuori were the defending champions but chose not to defend their title.

Luca Castelnuovo and Manuel Guinard won the title after defeating Sergio Galdós and Gonçalo Oliveira 0–6, 6–4, [11–9] in the final.

Seeds

Draw

References

External links
 Main draw

Dutch Open - Doubles
2021 Doubles